Ezra Cline (1907 - 1984) was an American bluegrass bassist.

Cline was born on 13 January 1907 at Glbert Creek, West Virginia.

He began performing locally with his cousins Ireland "Lazy Ned" Cline and Ray "Curly Ray" Cline, along with local guitarist Zeke Stepp, as the Lonesome Pine Fiddlers in Gilbert Creek, WV.  The three cousins worked in the coal mines during the week and played music on the weekends until 1938, when they left Mingo County, WV for Bluefield, WV to perform on WHIS radio.

Cline was the oldest of 15 children, and when their father died at 57, he was left to care for his younger siblings.   
Ned Cline was killed in World War II, and was replaced by Charlie Cline in 1947.

In November 1953, Cline and the Lonesome Pine Fiddlers were performing on the WJR Big Barn Frolic.  During the week, he worked at the Hudson plant in Detroit, Michigan.  He hired Melvin and Ray Goins, following the departure of Charlie Cline (who went to work for Bill Monroe) and Paul Williams (who went to work for Jimmy Martin), and moved back to Kentucky to perform on a new station, WLSI in Pikeville.

Cline died 11 July 1984.

References 

1907 births
1984 deaths
Bluegrass musicians from Kentucky
American bluegrass guitarists
American male guitarists
20th-century American guitarists
Guitarists from Kentucky
Country musicians from Kentucky
20th-century American male musicians